Tmesipteris horomaka, commonly known as the Banks Peninsula fork fern, is a fern ally endemic to New Zealand.

Description
Tmesipteris horomaka is usually found on the stem of the tree ferns, i.e., epiphytic fern or sometimes found on the ground, or soil from decomposing logs, i.e., terrestrial fern. Many stems of Tmesipteris horomaka can be found on a single fern tree, but it is hard to tell whether they belong to single individual fern, as Tmesipteris plants have creeping rootstock from which various shoots may arise. It has continuous creeping rootstock with the aerial stem grows to a length that ranges between 60 and 510 mm and with a width of 15 to 35 mm. The leaves are rounded at the apex and have a small spike, known as mucron at the top of the leaves, which grows to the length of 10 to 25 mm and has a width that ranges between 2.5 and 6.5 mm. The structure of this species is somewhat in between of T. elongata and T. tannensis. The difference between T. horomaka and T. tannensis is that of the placement of the spore-producing synangia, and it differs from T. elongata by having a truncate leaf with a notch at the apex of the leaves. The characteristics of Tmesipteris horomaka is further differentiated from that of its parent by its spore size both of which are tetraploid while T. horomaka is octoploid.

Habitat

Tmesipteris horomaka is an epiphyte in nature; they are usually found of hanging from the trunk of tree ferns or other trees in the forest for infrastructure and support. The initial observation of T. horomaka was as an epiphyte around the stem of the tree fern; however, a sample which came from Port Hills registered it to be found on the decaying matter of Phormium (flax) which was on the southeast cliff face. The tree ferns that can host T. horomaka are Cyathea dealbata, C. smithii, and Dicksonia squarrosa are found in podocarp, broadleaved, and beech forest. So far it is only found in New Zealand with the population found in the area of Banks Peninsula and the Port Hills near Christchurch.

Ecology

Life cycle/Phenology
There are two distinct changes that take place during the life of a fern which belongs to a group of vascular plants, i.e., from the sporophytic phase to a gametophytic phase. The spores of the fern are haploid and are produced in an organ called sporangia, which can be found on the leaves of the fern, also called fronds. A tiny portion of the spores gets dispersed into the atmosphere due to the current of the wind and falls inappropriate site to form a gametophyte. The fertilization takes place when the eggs and sperm are produced on the different gametophyte, and the results are placed in the tissue of prothallium until the embryo breaks its dormancy and cell division takes place, which finally leads to the development of gametophyte.

Diet and foraging
The rhizome of this species is not a root. The rhizome cannot perform the process of photosynthesis as it is not photosynthetic in nature. It is covered by minute golden brown hairs all over its body, which is called rhizoids. It is understood that it receives its supplementary nutrients from a fungus situated within its tissue.

Threats
Bio Status: Endemic

Tmesipteris horomaka was considered as a threatened species by the Department of Conservation and was receiving extra support for the management. The total population of Tmesipteris horomaka was found to be less than 250 of mature individuals, which brings them to the criteria of endangered species, this was also classified under lack of data and currently found in only one location. As this species is newly discovered, further survey is needed, and so far, through the preliminary population survey, the biggest threat to it is the safety and survival of its host plant.

Food
The rhizome of this species is not a root. The rhizome cannot perform the process of photosynthesis as it is not photosynthetic in nature. It is covered by minute golden brown hairs all over its body, which is called rhizoids. It is understood that it receives its supplementary nutrients from a fungus situated within its tissue.

Other Information
Tmesipteris horomaka was discovered when researchers Leon R Perrie, Patrick J Brownsey were on their survey researching the chromosome number in two species of the Tmesipteris, which ended by finding a new octoploid fern on the Bank Peninsula. This species was a cross between a locally occurring species T. elengata and T. tannensis, and the characteristic of the new species was utterly different from that of its parents. The prothalli, also known as gametophytes, are hard to find. They are rarely found in the environment. This is due to the dense population of Tmesipteris, the location it grows, and the dormancy period before it grows as an individual plant

References

Psilotaceae
Ferns of New Zealand
Epiphytes